Gordon Hewart, 1st Viscount Hewart,  (7 January 1870 – 5 May 1943) was a politician and judge in the United Kingdom.

Background and education
Hewart was born in Bury, Lancashire, the eldest son of Giles Hewart, a draper, and Annie Elizabeth Jones. He was educated at Bury Grammar School, Manchester Grammar School and University College, Oxford.

Political and legal career

Hewart began his career as a journalist for the Manchester Guardian and the Morning Leader. He was called to the bar at the Inner Temple in 1902, joining the Northern Circuit. He took silk in 1912.

He was a Liberal Member of Parliament for Leicester from 1913, and, after the constituency was divided in 1918, Leicester East. An advanced Liberal, he was appointed Solicitor General in 1916, receiving the customary knighthood, and was sworn of the Privy Council in 1918. He was Attorney General from 10 January 1919 to 6 March 1922. He was given a seat in the Cabinet in 1921. 

While in office, he refused offers to become Chief Secretary for Ireland or Home Secretary; at the time, the Attorney General had the right of first refusal for the post of Lord Chief Justice, which was Hewart's ambition.

Lord Chief Justice 
On the resignation of the Earl of Reading as Lord Chief Justice of England in 1921, Hewart asked to succeed him. However, David Lloyd George was reluctant to lose him, and, as a compromise, the 77-year-old Sir A. T. Lawrence (Lord Trevethin from August 1921) was appointed instead as a stop-gap; he was required to furnish an undated letter of resignation to Lloyd George, an arrangement which scandalised many: Lord Birkenhead thought it 'illegal', while judges boycotted the farewell ceremony for Lord Reading.

On 3 March 1922, Trevethin 'resigned' (an event which he learned from The Times), and Hewart was duly appointed Lord Chief Justice of England on 8 March 1922, and was elevated to the peerage as Baron Hewart, of Bury, in the County of Lancaster on 24 March 1922.

In May 1922 Hewart was closely involved in the drafting of the Constitution of the Irish Free State. He worked closely with his Irish counterpart, Hugh Kennedy in May 1922 to finalise the text in time for elections the following month.

In 1929, Hewart published The New Despotism, in which he asserted that the rule of law in Britain was being undermined by the executive at the expense of the legislature and the courts. This book was very controversial and led to the appointment of a Committee on Ministers' Powers—chaired by the Earl of Donoughmore—but its Report rejected Hewart's arguments.

He has been described  as "one of the most vigorous and vociferous believers in the impeccability of the English jury system of this or any other century". However, in 1931, Hewart made legal history, when (sitting with Mr Justice Branson and Mr Justice Hawke) he quashed the conviction for murder of William Herbert Wallace, on the grounds that the conviction could not be supported by the evidence. In other words, the jury was wrong.

Lord Hewart was the originator (paraphrased from the original) of the aphorism "Not only must Justice be done; it must also be seen to be done."

In 1940, Hewart was asked by telephone by 10 Downing Street to resign; he duly did so on 12 October 1940. On his retirement, he was created Viscount Hewart, of Bury in the County Palatine of Lancaster, on 1 November 1940.

Death
He died 5 May 1943 in Totteridge, Barnet, Hertfordshire, aged 73.

Family
Lord Hewart married twice; first in 1892 Sarah Wood Riley, daughter of J. H. Riley and secondly in 1934, Jean Stewart, the daughter of J. R. Stewart. With his first wife he had a daughter Katharine and a son and heir, Hugh. When he died in Totteridge, on 5 May 1943, his titles were inherited by his son, Hugh Hewart, 2nd Viscount Hewart.

Arms

Notable decisions 
Rex v Sussex Justices, ex parte McCarthy
Rex v Wallace

Notes

References

Further reading
R. Jackson, The chief: the biography of Gordon Hewart, lord chief justice of England, 1922–40 (1959)
R. F. V. Heuston, Lives of the Lord Chancellors, 1885–1940 (1964)
R. Stevens, The independence of the judiciary: the view from the lord chancellor's office (1993)
R. Stevens, 'Hewart, Gordon, first Viscount Hewart (1870–1943)’, Oxford Dictionary of National Biography (2004)

External links 

 
 

1870 births
1943 deaths
Liberal Party (UK) MPs for English constituencies
Lord chief justices of England and Wales
Members of the Privy Council of the United Kingdom
UK MPs 1910–1918
UK MPs 1918–1922
UK MPs who were granted peerages
Attorneys General for England and Wales
Solicitors General for England and Wales
People educated at Manchester Grammar School
Alumni of University College, Oxford
People from Bury, Greater Manchester
People educated at Bury Grammar School
Knights Bachelor
Members of the Inner Temple
Members of the Parliament of the United Kingdom for constituencies in Lancashire
Barons created by George V
Viscounts created by George VI